Lorcha may refer to:

Lorcha/L'Orxa, a municipality in the Valencian Community, Spain
Lorcha (boat), a type of sailing vessel having a Chinese junk rig on a Portuguese or European style hull

See also
 Lorca (disambiguation)